Kendrick Brothers is an American Evangelical Christian film production company in Albany, Georgia, United States.

History 
Kendrick Brothers was founded in 2013 in Albany, Georgia by Alex Kendrick, Stephen Kendrick and Shannon Kendrick, filmmakers of Sherwood Pictures. After releasing several increasingly successful faith-based movies with Sherwood Pictures including Flywheel, Facing the Giants, Fireproof, and Courageous, Kendrick Brothers was formed as a production company to "step beyond Sherwood and expand their filmmaking ministry" with the new company subsequently releasing War Room, Overcomer, Show Me the Father, and Courageous Legacy. Their most recent work Lifemark, debuted on Fathom Events on September 9, 2022.

References

External links 
 

Christian film production companies
Film production companies of the United States